Mood Muzik may refer to:

 Mood Muzik: The Worst of Joe Budden, a mixtape by rapper Joe Budden (2004)
 Mood Muzik 2: Can It Get Any Worse?, a mixtape by Joe Budden (2005)
 Mood Muzik 3: For Better or For Worse, a mixtape by Joe Budden (2007)
 Mood Muzik 3: The Album, an album by rapper Joe Budden (2008)
 Mood Muzik 3: We Got The Remix, a mixtape by DJ Benzi and rapper Joe Budden (2008)